Morne Bruce is a hillside enclave located in Roseau, Dominica. It offers a panoramic view of the city and the Caribbean Sea beyond. The site was once home to the military garrison that protected Roseau, and remains of the original barracks and officers' quarters can still be seen today. One of the old cannons (non-operational) is still located at the site, near a giant cross that was erected in the 1920s.

Etymology 

It was named after James Bruce, a captain of the Royal Engineers who designed many of Dominica's forts in the 1700s.

History 
The hill was once home to a military garrison that protected Roseau from the 1770s to 1854 from the French. Remains of the original barracks and officers’ quarters can still be seen today, along with one of the old cannons. A giant cross was erected at the summit of Morne Bruce in the 1920s.

The idea of establishing the Roseau Botanic Gardens near Morne Bruce was conceived in 1889 by the British Crown Government.

References 

Geography of Dominica
Mountains of the Caribbean
Tourist attractions in Dominica
Dominica
Parks in Dominica